is a 2001 Japanese mystery novel written by Honobu Yonezawa. It is the first volume of the  series. Five additional volumes have been published between 2002 and 2016. A manga adaptation drawn by Taskohna began serialization in the March 2012 issue of Kadokawa Shoten's Shōnen Ace. A 22-episode anime adaptation produced by Kyoto Animation and directed by Yasuhiro Takemoto aired from April 22 to September 16, 2012. A live-action film, Hyouka: Forbidden Secrets, directed by Mari Asato and starring Kento Yamazaki and Alice Hirose was released on November 3, 2017.

Plot
At the request of his older sister, student Hotaro Oreki joins Kamiyama High School's Classic Literature Club to stop it from being abolished, joined by fellow members Eru Chitanda, Satoshi Fukube and Mayaka Ibara. The story is set in Kamiyama City, a fictional city in Gifu Prefecture that the author based on his real hometown of Takayama, also in Gifu. The fictional Kamiyama High School is based upon the real life Hida High School. They begin to solve various mysteries, both to help with their club and at Eru's requests.

Characters

Main characters

Played by: Kento Yamazaki
The main protagonist of Hyouka, he is a pragmatic boy who lives by "If I don't have to do something, I won't, but if I have to, I'll do it quickly." He only joins the Classic Literature Club at the request of his older sister, Tomoe Oreki, to stop it from being dissolved. He says that he doesn't like to waste energy, but if given a mystery to consider, he will see it through until it is solved with his brilliant logical deductions. However, he does not like to be told about his talent for deductions and continues to claim that he was "just lucky". To him, Eru is "someone he can't ignore," hinting that he may have feelings for her. At her urging, he soon finds himself more involved with high school life.

Played by: Alice Hirose
An inquisitive girl who joins the Classic Literature Club. Eru's catchphrase is "I'm curious!" ("I have to know!" in the English dub). Although her memory is excellent and she earns top grades in school, she is also easily distracted and relies on Oreki's reasoning abilities. An energetic girl, she is well-versed in the town traditions and etiquette, having come from a lineage of wealthy farmers. Whenever a mystery is brought to her attention, she is unable to stop thinking about it. She holds great admiration for Oreki, for whom it is hinted that she has developed feelings. She often praises Oreki for his deductive talent and ability to solve almost any problem.

Played by: Amane Okayama
Hotaro's classmate who joins the Classic Literature Club with him. He is proud of his impressive memory, referring to himself as a human "database", and wears a perpetual grin. Although he always urges Oreki to participate more in life, it is revealed that he is also secretly jealous of Oreki for his critical reasoning abilities. He mocks Oreki when he performs an energy-consuming task. He calls Mayaka Ibara by her first name, which indicates the two are close. Later on, Satoshi reveals that he does have feelings for Mayaka, but doesn't want to become "obsessed" with her. He begins to date Mayaka in the spring of their second year.

Played by: Fujiko Kojima
The fourth member of the Classic Literature Club; she joined after the other three. She and the boys attended the same middle school. She doesn't get along well with Hotaro though their relationship starts to improve after she befriends Eru. Mayaka has a passion for drawing manga and is also a member of the school's manga club, though she is extremely reluctant about expressing the fact, often shushing others when mentioning the word "cosplay". Mayaka has long harbored romantic feelings towards Satoshi, who has always treated her in a frivolous way. She later begins to date Satoshi. She refers to Satoshi as Fuku-chan.

Class 2-F students

A friend of Eru. A beautiful and queenly girl known by her nickname . She is an expert at manipulating others, but envies Chitanda for her naivete. She leads her class members in making an independent film for Kan'ya Festival.

A close friend of Hongō's. She seems shy and reserved, and also describes Hongō as "diligent, careful, has a strong sense of responsibility, ridiculously kind, and easily moved."

Assistant Director in Class 2-F's independent film. He was one of the three detectives involved in solving the mystery of Hongō's unfinished script.

The Props Master in Class 2-F's independent film. He also was one of the three detectives involved in solving the mystery of Hongō's unfinished script.

The Publicity Manager in Class 2-F's independent film. She was one of the three detectives involved in solving the mystery of Hongō's unfinished script. Her name was earlier seen on the list of girls who'd checked a certain book out from the school library for a single afternoon each. She further appears in the festival's Cooking Contest, and still later is one of those asked if she'd seen any clue to the theft of Mayaka's Valentine chocolate.

Other characters

Hotaro's bold older sister who returns from traveling around the world. A former Classic Literature Club member that suggested Hotaro join the club. She always teases him for being so introverted. She has great deductive powers that may be equal or even greater than her brother Hotaro, as shown when she correctly deduces Fuyumi Irisu's intentions behind the independent film incident.

The school's 49 (61 in the anime) year old teacher-librarian and was the Classic Literature Club's first president the year after the incident regarding Jun Sekitani.

Played by: Kanata Hongō
An unsung tragic hero of Kamiyama School's past. He is Eru Chitanda's uncle, who went missing while traveling, and is presumed dead. Forced to be the scapegoat for a school protest, he took on the full burden and was expelled. He was the president of the Classic Literature Club and the writer for the anthology "Hyouka". The title means "frozen treat" in Japanese, but actually refers to the English words "ice cream": it is a pun on "I scream", thus revealing Jun's silent anguish. He is thought to be lost in India and is later declared legally dead by the authorities for being missing for so many years.

A third-year student at Kamiyama High School and the president of the Newspaper Club. He is a scion of the Tōgaito family, which is regarded for their contributions to the field of education.

A second-year student and he is a member of Magic Club.

Class A's math teacher. He's described by Satoshi as 'Strict but only because he's strict on himself.'

A first-year who likes to compete with Satoshi.

The president of the Manga Society.

A member of the Manga Society and a friend of Shōko.

A friend of Ayako and the writer for A Corpse by Evening.

A friend of Eru and a classmate of Satoshi. Her family runs the Arekusu Shrine, where she is a shrine maiden. She is also the only remaining member of the school's Fortune Telling Club.

A second-year student at Kamiyama High School and a member of Kan'ya Festival Executive Committee. He is also the background artist for A Corpse by Evening.

A second-year student at Kamiyama High School, and the Student Council President. He is a talented illustrator and the main artist for A Corpse by Evening.

A relative of Mayaka, and Kayo's older sister. She has a habit of writing names on her own items, not letting her sister use them.

Rie's younger sister, who is quieter and meeker than her. Unlike Rie, she doesn't write her name on her items.

Media

Novels
Hyouka is the first novel in the  series, written by Honobu Yonezawa and published by Kadokawa Shoten on October 31, 2001. As of November 30, 2016, six volumes (novels and short story collections) have been published in the series. A seventh novel has been confirmed by the author on Twitter. Short stories are published in Kadokawa Shoten's Yasei Jidai magazine. Each of the novels has an English subtitle, most of which reference other detective novels. A book titled , featuring interviews with Yonezawa and others involved in the series, a new short story, and other reference material was released on October 13, 2017.

Manga
A manga adaptation, titled Hyouka and illustrated by Taskohna, started serialization in the March 2012 issue of Kadokawa Shoten's Shōnen Ace. Kadokawa Shoten published 14 tankōbon volumes from April 26, 2012 to March 25, 2022. The manga's first twelve volumes adapted the first four novels, same as the anime series. A sequel series started in the August 2019 issue of Shōnen Ace.

Anime

In 2012, a television anime series based on the Classical Literature Club series novels aired in Japan. It was produced by Kyoto Animation, covering four volumes of the novel.

Reception
In October 2017, it was reported that the novels have 2.05 million copies in print.

References

2001 Japanese novels
2012 manga
Anime and manga based on novels
Kadokawa Dwango franchises
Japanese mystery novels
Mystery anime and manga
Novels set in high schools and secondary schools
School life in anime and manga
Shōnen manga
Slice of life anime and manga